The Kolanka Cup is a polo trophy awarded in India. According to the Guinness Book of World Records, it is the "tallest sports trophy in the world". It is named after the Rajah of Kolanka Sri Rajah Rao Pradyumna Krishna Mahipati Suryarao Bahadur who got it made as a polo player under his own team name, the Kolanka team. The Rajah of  Kolanka was the 4th Raja Kumara of venkatagiri i.e. he was the fourth son of the 29th Raja of Venkatagiri and the grandson of Rajagopala Krishna Yachendra of Venkatagiri and was adopted by the childless Rani of Kolanka.

The Kolanka Cup stands 6 feet tall and is made out of pure silver.

When it comes to sports trophies, most competitors are more concerned with winning them than with appreciating their legacy. In polo this is particularly true, especially when the importance of competitions at which polo trophies are presented is not always reflected in how big, beautiful or impressive the prizes might be.

Size for one, is irrelevant for polo prizes. The Queen's Cup – traditionally presented by Her Majesty The Queen at Guards Polo Club to the winners of England's second most important tournament – is the sort of small, plain silver bowl one might find filled with bon-bons on a sideboard in a stately home. This discreet royal prize is dwarfed by the six-foot tall Kolanka Cup, awarded to the winners of a humble competition in Chennai. Donated by the Raja of Kolanka between the wars (late 1920s or early 1930s), the cup is marked by the Guinness Book of Records as the world's largest sports trophy. While the Queen's Cup won't even hold a full bottle of celebratory champagne, it would take more than 27 bottles of bubbly to fill the giant Indian trophy. The Kolanka Cup towers above even the Coronation Cup.

The last match for the Kolanka Cup is said to have been played in 1998. Since then the cup has been in storage.

References 

http://hurlinghampolo.com/backissues/summer_2007/html/Hurlingham_e-Mag/page_41.html
http://members.iinet.net.au/~royalty/ips/v/venkatagiri.html

Indian sports trophies and awards
Polo in India
Sport in Tamil Nadu